The Knockout Stage of the 1999 Fed Cup Americas Zone Group II was the final stage of the Zonal Competition involving teams from the Americas. Those that qualified for this stage placed first and second in their respective pools.

The eight teams were then randomly drawn into two two-stage knockout tournaments, with the winners advancing to next year's Americas Zone Group I.

Semifinals

Uruguay vs. Bahamas

Jamaica vs. Bolivia

Cuba vs. Barbados

Dominican Republic vs. Peru

Finals

Uruguay vs. Bolivia

  advanced to Group I for 2000, where they placed fourth in their pool of five.

Cuba vs. Peru

  advanced to Group I for 2000, where they placed last in their pool of five and was thus relegated back to Group II for 2001.

See also
Fed Cup structure

References

External links
 Fed Cup website

1999 Fed Cup Americas Zone